Savage is a crater on Mercury.  Its name was adopted by the International Astronomical Union (IAU) in 2013, and is named for the American sculptor Augusta Savage.

Savage is northwest of the smaller but similar Ruysch crater.

References

Impact craters on Mercury